The cinnamon bracken warbler (Bradypterus cinnamomeus) is a species of Old World warbler in the family Locustellidae.
It is found in Burundi, Democratic Republic of the Congo, Ethiopia, Kenya, Malawi, Mozambique, Rwanda, South Sudan, Tanzania, Uganda, and Zambia.
Its natural habitats are subtropical or tropical moist montane forests and subtropical or tropical moist shrubland.

References

Bradypterus
Birds of Central Africa
Birds of East Africa
Birds described in 1840
Taxonomy articles created by Polbot